The Hungarian Declaration of Independence declared the independence of Hungary from the Habsburg monarchy during the Hungarian Revolution of 1848.  It was presented to the National Assembly in closed session on 13 April 1849 by Lajos Kossuth, and in open session the following day, despite political opposition from within the Hungarian Peace Party.  The declaration was passed unanimously the following day.

Kossuth issued the declaration himself, from the Protestant Great Church of Debrecen. The declaration accused the Habsburgs of crimes, saying

In a banquet speech before the Corporation of New York, Kossuth urged the United States to recognize Hungarian independence, saying

Further reading 
  — the full text of the Declaration of Independence, translated into English

References

1849 in law
1849 documents
1849 in Hungary
Hungarian Revolution of 1848
Declarations of independence
Legal history of Hungary
April 1849 events